Dewan Nazrul is a Bangladeshi film director, lyricist, screenwriter and freedom fighter of Bangladesh Liberation War.

Movie Direction 
Dewan Nazrul became involved in filmmaking as an apprentice in Ibn Mizan's movie Nagini Prem.  After the independence of Bangladesh in 1974, he acted as the chief assistant director and lyricist in the film 'Daku Mansur.  Since then he has been working as an assistant director in various films.  Dewan Nazrul's first film was 'Asami Hajir as a main director.  However, for some reason he could not finish the work of the film.  Then in 1976 he started making Dost Dushman film. It was released in 1977.  This is the first released film directed by Dewan Nazrul. The film became famous and Dewan Nazrul got a permanent seat as a director in Bengali movie arena.  The film successfully depicts a western-style fight. by this film, Jashim became the first action hero of Dhallywood.

Film 
Some of the famous films directed by Dewan Nazrul are:

 Dost Dushman (1977)
 Asami Hajir (1978)
 Barood (1978)
 Johnny (1983) 
 Qurbani (1985) 
 Dhormo Amar Maa (1986)
 Asman Jomin (1990) 
 Mastaan Raja (1992)
 Kaliya (1993)
 Matir Durgo (1994)
 Banglar Nayok (1995)
 'Sujon Bondhu Dojokh'' (2005)

Song 
Besides making films, Dewan Nazrul has written many songs.  Some of his famous songs are:

Awards 

 Bachsas Award

References 

Bangladeshi film directors
Bangladeshi screenwriters
Living people
1950 births